International Hobo (also known as "ihobo") is a consultancy incorporation in video game industry.
ihobo was founded by Chris Bateman in 1999 and it is based in Manchester, England.
They provide services about game design, narrative design and scriptwriting. 
ihobo focuses on role-playing, platform, and children's games. In addition to working on many video games over the years, ihobo also has published a few books on video game design, such as Game Writing: Narrative Skills for Videogames and  Beyond Game Design: Nine Steps Towards Creating Better Videogames.

The company has worked on titles targeting the core audience for video games such as MotorStorm: Apocalypse and S.T.A.L.K.E.R. (2 million units), as well as titles targeting more unusual audiences, such as Bratz: Rock Angelz (1.4 million units).

It provided the first proof that external game design was a viable proposition with Ghost Master (nominated for Best New IP in Develop Industry Excellence Awards), and has also worked on chart-topping titles like Reservoir Dogs.

The members of International Hobo have worked on major game projects for publishers like Electronic Arts, Sony Computer Entertainment Europe, Ubisoft, THQ, Take 2, Namco, Atari, Eidos, Codemasters, Vivendi Universal, SCi, 3DO, and Turner Interactive.

Games with services from International Hobo

References

External links
Official website

Video game companies of the United Kingdom